Pseudoclivina calida is a species of ground beetle in the family Carabidae, found in Sudan.

References

Scaritinae
Beetles described in 1866